Universal Pictures Home Entertainment (formerly Universal Studios Home Entertainment, Universal Studios Home Video, MCA/Universal Home Video, MCA Home Video, MCA Videodisc, and MCA Videocassette, Inc.) is the home video distribution division of American film studio Universal Pictures, owned by the NBCUniversal Film and Entertainment division of NBCUniversal, which is owned by Comcast.

History
The company was founded in 1980 as MCA Videocassette, Inc. with Gene Giaquinto as president of the division. It released 24 films on Betamax and VHS in May 1980, including Jaws, Animal House, and The Deer Hunter as well as classic films such as Dracula, Animal Crackers, and Scarface. Jaws 2 and 1941 were also released that year. Before 1980 Castle Films (known as Universal 8 after 1977) had served as Universal's home film distribution unit. In late 1983, both the Laserdisc sister label MCA Videodisc and the VHS/Beta label MCA Videocassette, Inc. were consolidated into a single entity, MCA Home Video, alternating with the MCA Videocassette, Inc. name until December 1983. In 1990, with the 75th anniversary of Universal Studios, it became MCA/Universal Home Video and used that name alternating with the MCA Home Video name from 1990 until 1997. The company later used other company names, including Universal Studios Home Video (1997–2005) and Universal Studios Home Entertainment (2005–2016).

In 1980, it released two '50s 3-D motion pictures, Creature from the Black Lagoon and It Came from Outer Space, in anaglyphic format on Beta and VHS.

In 1986, MCA Home Video had inked a distribution deal with video distributor Kartes Video Communications to re-release older and classic titles on videocassette, with six titles from the Universal catalog. The deal was followed with a similar agreement in 1987. MCA Home Video inked a distribution deal in 1987 with GoodTimes Home Video to re-release several MCA catalog titles for a low price.

In 1986, the company had inked an agreement with Motown Productions, in order to launch a series of four "Motown Video Originals" in an effort to enter the direct-to-video market as "mini-movies" which was budgeted in the mid-six figures, and wanted to be viewed as breakthrough programs by MCA in the anticipated "longform music video" category. Also in the same year, the company formed a partnership with children's book publisher Price Stern Sloan, who already had success with the Wee Sing titles. He made a deal with the company to handle videocassette releases of children's programs, like Mr. Men and The World's Worst Jokes, which were the first two projects offered; the deal was for $100,000. MCA handled worldwide distribution of PSS projects, with the exceptions of Mr. Men and Wee Sing; PSS handled worldwide distribution.

In 1987, MCA Distribution Corp., which normally distributed titles from MCA Home Video and independent home video distributor International Video Entertainment signed an exclusive three-year agreement. It provided that all product produced by IVE, as well as subsidiary label Family Home Entertainment, would be delivered to MCA, which that would only handle distribution for the company, as well as IVE. IVE would continue to control sales and marketing policies and activities, to be in effect by March 1, and an IVE subsidiary Creative Video Services would handle a multi-year agreement with the company. Creative Video Services would supply the company with over 1 million videocassettes a year; the videocassettes were produced by MCA in a year. Initial releases covered by the agreement are a series of titles produced by Carolco Pictures and Scotti Bros. Pictures; MCA would offer to distribute new videocassettes from Ringling Bros. and Barnum and Bailey Circus. In that year MCA had restructured its MCA Home Entertainment unit, naming business affairs vice president Sondra Berchin. Berchin would take over the new position as executive president of the MCA Home Entertainment division; she was responsible for giving new titles and responsibilities to Ned Nalle, Louis Feola, and Blair Westlake. The three were previously alumus of various MCA/Universal units, namely Universal Pay Television.
 
After the founding of NBCUniversal in 2004, Universal started releasing DVDs of shows from the newly established NBCUniversal Television Distribution.

Universal 1440 Entertainment was formed in 2005 as the production arm of Universal Studios Home Entertainment.

This company was the worldwide video distributor for DreamWorks titles until DreamWorks was sold to Paramount Pictures' parent company, Viacom, in 2006, at which point Paramount took over distribution. After Viacom spun off DreamWorks in 2008, Universal Studios Home Entertainment was planned to resume distributing DreamWorks' movies, but this deal fell through. Until Lionsgate formed their home video division, their releases were distributed by Universal with the exception of Dogma, which was distributed by Columbia TriStar Home Video. In 2007, it was signed on as home video distributor of releases by Summit Entertainment.
 
In addition to DVDs, Universal was a major supporter of the HD DVD format until Toshiba discontinued the format. Since July 22, 2008, UPHE released Blu-rays and it was the last major Hollywood movie studio to do so. The first three Blu-ray releases to come out in the U.S. were The Mummy, its sequel The Mummy Returns and The Scorpion King. Since August 9, 2016, UPHE started releasing Ultra HD Blu-rays.

UPHE is the home video distributor for all of the Universal Pictures film library, the Focus Features film library, and shows from NBCUniversal Television Distribution (NBC, E!, Syfy, USA Network, Universal Kids, and Oxygen). The division also currently has distribution deals with Bleecker Street (until 2021), The Film Arcade, Aviron Pictures, STX Entertainment, 101 Studios, Open Road Films, Metro-Goldwyn-Mayer via United Artists Releasing (until 2022), Pinnacle Peak Pictures, Picturehouse, Blumhouse Tilt, DreamWorks Classics (via DreamWorks Animation), Big Idea Entertainment, Neon (until 2021 when distribution shifted to Decal), Entertainment One (in Canada, UK, Australia, Spain, Germany and USA), and Amazon Studios (starting with Brad's Status). Distribution is currently handled by Studio Distribution Services, LLC., a joint venture between UPHE and Warner Bros. Home Entertainment.

In 2015, two years prior to Sony Pictures Television acquiring a 95% stake in Funimation (now known as Crunchyroll, LLC), Funimation formed a multi-year home video distribution deal with UPHE. Sony Pictures Home Entertainment soon took over after the UPHE deal expired.

Starting on June 5, 2018, Universal re-released all of DreamWorks Animation's film library after their deal with 20th Century Studios (at the time named 20th Century Fox) ended.

Studio Distribution Services, LLC
On January 14, 2020, Universal and Warner Bros. Home Entertainment announced that they would partner on a 10-year multinational joint-venture, merging their physical operations in North America. Universal will distribute Warner Bros.' titles in Germany, Austria, Switzerland and Japan; while Warner will distribute Universal's titles in the United Kingdom, Italy and Benelux. On April 7, 2020, the European Commission approved the merger. The company was later named Studio Distribution Services, LLC. Since June 1, 2021, SDS' logo took the UPHE logo's place on the back covers of the home releases; while there have been several exceptions that had the UPHE logo in place, mainly 4K (including steelbooks) and Blu-ray releases.

Internationally
On February 28, 1999, Universal signed a multi-year deal with Columbia TriStar Home Video to allow the latter to distribute Universal DVDs outside North America.

In the Netherlands, UPHE used to distribute most DVDs of films released theatrically by Independent Films, although this is now limited to catalog releases, as more recent films are now released through Warner Bros. Home Entertainment and later on, Belga Home Video.

UPHE also distributes StudioCanal titles on home media in France, most of the Republic Pictures library in the UK and most of the Carolco Pictures library in Australia, Latin America, and several European countries (along with other StudioCanal properties) until StudioCanal's global distribution deal with Universal expired in January 2022. In the 1980s until the late 1990s, they also distributed tapes released by Cineplex Odeon in Canada.

UPHE previously distributed its films on video internationally through CIC Video (a division of Cinema International Corporation, later United International Pictures) alongside Paramount Pictures. In Japan, releases from both Universal and Paramount appeared on CIC-Victor Video, Ltd. (a joint venture between CIC Video and JVC) for VHS and on Pioneer LDC, Inc. for Laserdisc. Following Universal's acquisition of PolyGram in 1999, PolyGram Video (which had international operations) was dissolved into Universal.

UPHE's international operations are a joint venture with Sony Pictures Home Entertainment, a carryover from the PolyGram days, but more often than not, both UPHE and SPHE operate a joint venture in Australia, New Zealand and Scandinavia called Universal Sony Pictures Home Entertainment. The venture distributes UPHE and SPHE titles on home media in those countries and also licensed anime series and films from the anime library of NBCUniversal Entertainment Japan, the Japanese division of UPHE's sister company, Universal Pictures International Entertainment, formerly known as Pioneer LDC from 1981 to 2003, Geneon Entertainment from 2003 to 2009 and Geneon Universal Entertainment from 2009 to very late 2013, the year they switched to their current name. The name of the joint venture is Universal Sony Pictures Home Entertainment Australia. Before that, though, NBCUniversal Entertainment Japan had a marketing and distribution division in North America called Geneon USA, which, like UPHE, also distributed home video. At the time, NBCUEJ was known as Geneon Entertainment. Geneon USA shut down in late 2007, and Universal has licensed all of NBCUniversal Entertainment Japan's catalog to other companies rather than directly distributing them themselves. Starting on March 26, 2022, NBCUEJ (through UPHE) distributes and licenses anime series and films.

From 2017 to 2018, Funimation began directly distributing a select number of its titles in Australia and New Zealand through Universal Sony Pictures Home Entertainment Australia. In September 2018, Funimation transferred distribution to Madman Entertainment, with Madman handling distribution and classification within the region.

On October 3, 2014, Universal established global headquarters for its home video division in Los Angeles.

At the start of 2015, Paramount Home Entertainment signed a distribution agreement with Universal, whereby the latter will distribute the former's titles overseas, particularly the territories where Paramount holds an office. The deal began on July 1, 2015, in the United Kingdom. Universal will continue distributing Paramount's DVDs and Blu-rays out of the United States and Canada. With the distributor change for Universal's titles in the UK, Paramount Home Entertainment signed a new UK home entertainment distribution deal with StudioCanal UK and Lionsgate UK's Elevation Sales on July 14, 2020 that began in January 2021.

Along with the announcement of the Universal/Warner Bros. NA physical home media joint-venture, Universal announced that they would begin handling home video distribution of Warner Bros. titles in Germany, Austria, Switzerland and Japan in the third quarter of 2020, while Warner Bros. announced that they would begin handling home video distribution of Universal titles in the United Kingdom, Italy, Belgium, the Netherlands and Luxembourg in the first quarter of 2021. In 2020, SF Studios had inked a distribution deal with Universal to handle titles across the Nordic region.

Universal 1440 Entertainment

Universal 1440 Entertainment is the direct-to-video entertainment label of Universal Pictures Home Entertainment created in 2005. The entity is a successor to MCA Family Entertainment.

The label does not have the on-screen logo; it uses the Universal Pictures logo.

Filmography

Notes and references

External links
 
 Studio Distribution Services

Universal Pictures subsidiaries
Home video companies established in 1980
Home video distributors
Home video companies of the United States